Denazinemys was a genus of baenid turtle that lived in the Late Cretaceous of New Mexico. The holotype specimen, which D. nodosa was based on, USNM 8345, consists of a partial carapace and plastron. It came from the De-na-zin Member of the Kirtland Formation, and therefore, Denazinemys lived in the Kirtlandian land-vertebrate age. Many specimens other than the holotype have been assigned to Denazinemys.

Distinguishing characteristics
Previously, Scabremys ornata was assigned to Denazinemys as D. ornata. Below are the features found in Denazinemys distinguishing the two genera:

 a carapace that is sub-triangular with widest dimension posteriorly;
 prepleurals present and touching the first vertebrae medially;
 the first vertebrae an irregular hexagonal shape with the greatest width posteriorly, contacting anterior second vertebrae;
 extracervicals lateral to the primary cervicals, the cervicals being sub-divided;
 and carapace nodes irregular and not forming distinct ridges.

Classification
Denazinemys is a baenid along with Plesiobaena, Boremys, Scabremys, Baena and Chisternon.

Below is a cladogram made by Sullivan et al. in 2013 showing the relations of Denazinemys: (note: Boremys pulchra is partly a junior synonym of Boremys grandis)

References

Baenidae
Late Cretaceous turtles of North America
Kaiparowits Formation
Fossil taxa described in 2006